The eleventh season of the American reality television series The Great Food Truck Race entitled The Great Food Truck Race: Holiday Hustle hosted by Tyler Florence began airing on the Food Network on November 27, 2019. It concluded on December 18, 2019, after airing a four episode season, making it the shortest season in the series history. It was announced on October 16, 2019, to be a special holiday-based season of the series. Five truck teams competed against each other in food-based competitions to be the last remaining team with one team being eliminated each week.

Format
On the first day five new truck teams meet with host Tyler Florence. Each team receives a brand new food truck and seed money to buy necessities to operate their truck. Over the course of a weekend they must attempt to sell as much food as possible to make profit. Along with selling food teams must also participate in a variety of challenges which can either help or harm them by having positive or negative responses based on the challenge results. Oftentimes teams either receive immunity from elimination, money toward their total, or extra selling time. The team with the least amount of money at the end of each weekend is eliminated from the competition and is required to return the keys to their truck before leaving. The last team remaining is allowed to keep their food truck and receives .

Truck teams
Big Stuff – This team from Parker, Colorado is all about any food that can be stuffed. Operated by Brad Brutlag and Eddie Cumming, along with friend/"marketing genius" Mike O'Neill, these three chefs usually work in galley kitchens, so they're used to working in small stations; making a food truck operation a breeze.

Creole Queens – An all-female team composed of married couple Tryshell and Raven Robertson, with extra support from their friend Ariana Mitchell. The first team in the race's history to be operated by a same-sex couple, these girls bring both the party and the culture of The Big Easy with food, love, and the overall experience found in New Orleans.

Lia's LUMPIA – This team out of San Diego consists of head chef Spencer Hunter, friend Tania Garcia, and Spencer's sous chef/mother Benelia Santos-Hunter. Spencer comes from a long line of restaurateurs, with his maternal grandmother being the one to bring Filipino cuisine to San Diego County; and he wants to continue that legacy with his catering company and occasional pop-up restaurants. They specialize in Filipino cuisine, especially Filipino lumpia.

Magical Mystery Heroes – Out of Butler County, Ohio comes self-proclaimed eclectic cook Matt Williams, his sous chef Hannah Schulz, and his cousin/Hannah's husband/frontman Chris, who are the employees behind this food truck. Their menu, as Matt calls it, is a "little bit of a mystery", as they change the theme of their menu every day. As Matt says, "We may serve sandwiches one day, the next day tacos. We like to keep it fresh."

Slap Shot – Another all-female team, sisters Annika and Michaela Johnson, with their mother Sheila, come from Bemidji, Minnesota, a region with cold temperatures rivalling that of New England. With a name as an ode to hockey, they serve up gourmet hockey-rink concessions faire, as the girls aim to give everyone in the U.S. a taste of the Midwest.

Episodes

Elimination history and results

 Team that won The Great Food Truck Race.
 Team who came in first that week.
 Team that won money towards their till that week.
 Team that won a non-monetary challenge for that week.
 Team eliminated for that week.

Notelist
: Slap Shot held off the Turkey Challenge until Day 2, while the other four teams used the turkey on Day 1.
: Dollar amounts were not announced, but the difference between Slap Shot and Big Stuff was $70.
: Dollar amount was $137 between bottom two teams, but it was said that if Creole Queens did not win the money from the team challenge, they would be going home instead.
: Dollar amounts were not announced, but the difference between the bottom two was $183.

Production
Food Network announced the season as part of their holiday programming on October 16, 2019.

Filming
Filming for the first episode began on February 18, and ended on February 21, 2019, in Wolfeboro, New Hampshire. The second episode began filming in Portsmouth, New Hampshire, on February 24, 2019, at Shapleigh Middle School, and continued on February 25 in Market Square. Episode three filmed at the Killington Ski Resort Snowshed Base Area in Killington, Vermont, on March 2, 2019, before moving to Rutland, Vermont on March 3. The final episode began filming on March 9, 2019, with a special kick-off event at Newport Vineyards in Newport, Rhode Island, the season then concluded filming on March 10.

References

External links
 
 List of season 11 episodes on Food Network

2019 American television seasons